The 2002 Ondrej Nepela Memorial was the 10th edition of an annual senior-level international figure skating competition held in Bratislava, Slovakia. It took place between September 27 and 29, 2002 at the Vladimír Dzurilla Ice Rink. Skaters competed in four disciplines: men's singles, ladies' singles, pair skating, and ice dancing. The competition is named for 1972 Olympic gold medalist Ondrej Nepela.

Results

Men

Ladies

Pairs

Ice dancing

External links
 10th Ondrej Nepela Memorial

Ondrej Nepela Memorial, 2002
Ondrej Nepela Memorial
Ondrej Nepela Memorial, 2002